Antarctic whales are any whales which are known to reside near Antarctica for at least part of the year.  This includes:
Arnoux's beaked whale
Blue whale
Dwarf sperm whale
Fin whale
Gray's beaked whale
Humpback whale
Minke whale
Antarctic minke whale
Pygmy right whale
Pygmy sperm whale
Sei whale
Southern bottlenose whale
Southern right whale
Sperm whale
Strap-toothed whale

Cetaceans
Animal common name disambiguation pages